Prior to its uniform adoption of proportional representation in 1999, the United Kingdom used first-past-the-post for the European elections in England, Scotland and Wales. The European Parliament constituencies used under that system were smaller than the later regional constituencies and only had one Member of the European Parliament each.

The constituency of Lancashire South was one of them.

When it was created in England in 1994, it consisted of the Westminster Parliament constituencies of Blackburn, Bury North, Chorley, Hyndburn, Rossendale and Darwen, South Ribble, West Lancashire.

MEPs

Election results

References

External links
 David Boothroyd's United Kingdom Election Results

European Parliament constituencies in England (1979–1999)
Politics of Lancashire
1994 establishments in England
1999 disestablishments in England
Constituencies established in 1994
Constituencies disestablished in 1999